Farley Katz (born 1984) is an American humorist. He was a staff cartoonist for The New Yorker. 
In October 2008, The New Yorker magazine online published an interview and "Cartoon Off" between Katz and Randall Munroe, in which each cartoonist drew a series of four humorous cartoons.

Katz is the author of the book Journal of a Schoolyard Bully.  

He graduated from Harvard University where he drew cartoons and was an editor for the Harvard Lampoon.

References

1984 births
Living people
American cartoonists
The New Yorker cartoonists
The Harvard Lampoon alumni